was a Japanese actor from Nankoku, Kōchi Prefecture. Takamatsu appeared in more than 120 films between 1948 and 2007.

Profile
In 1951, he signed his contract with Daiei film company. Two years later, Takamatsu made his film debut with Ikare Sanppie, playing the role of lover of the main character played by Ayako Wakao.

He was highly praised for his performance in such films as Giants and Toys, The Black Report and The Graceful Brute and became a well-reputed supporting actor. In 1962, he left Daiei and became a freelance actor. He won TV Guide Best Performer Award for his role in the Asadora series Kumo no jūtan in 1976. In 1988, Takamatsu played the role of General Takashi Hishikari in The Last Emperor directed by Bernardo Bertolucci.

Takamatsu died of myocardial infarction on February 26, in 2007.

Selected filmography

Films

 A Girl Isn't Allowed to Love (1955) as Engineer
 Tsukigata Hanpeita: Hana no maki; Arashi no maki (1956) as Akamatsu Daijirō
 Giants and Toys (1958) as Aida Ryuji
 The Snowy Heron (1958) as Tatsumi Yokichi
 Lord Nobunaga's Early Days (1959)
 A False Student (1960) as Prosecutor
 A Wife Confesses (1961) as Kasai
 Black Test Car (1962) as Onoda Toru
 The Graceful Brute (1962) as Katori Ichirō
 The Black Report (1963)
 Yakuza (893) gurentai  (1966)
 Shinka 101: Koroshi no Yojimbo (1966)
 Bandits vs. Samurai Squadron (1978) as Yamada Tobei
 Shōgun (1980) as Lord Toda Buntaro
 Eijanaika (1981) as Koide Yamato no Kami
 The Last Emperor (1987) as General Takashi Hishikari
 226/Four Days of Snow and Blood (1989)
 Shaso (1989) as Okabe Kensuke
 Daikaijū Tōkyō ni arawaru(1998) as Osawa Hikojirō
 Yomigaeri (2003) as Haruo Tsuda

Television dramas
 Jyudō Ichokusen (1969) as Kuruma Shusaku
 Ten to Chi to (1969) as  Kanazu Shinbei
 Daichūshingura (1971) as Kakui Rinzō
 Hissatsu Shiokinin (1973) as Tenjin no Koroku
 Genroku Taiheiki (1975) as Horiuchi Genzaemon
 Kumo no jūtan (1976) as Tone Yu
 Naruto Hichō as Tendō Ikkaku
 Fumō Chitai (1979) as Satoi Tatsuya
 Onihei Hankachō (1980) as Sashima Tadasuke
 Kage no Gundan IV (1985) (ep.16) as Inoue Koshu
 Taiyō ni Hoero! (1985) (ep.648) as Konishi
 Mito Kōmon (1989-1996) as Yamanobe Hyōgō
 Onihei Hankachō (1992) (ep.17) as Suzuka no Matabei
 Hideyoshi (1996) as Hayashi Sado no Kami
 Horibe Yasubei (2007) as Horibe Yahei

References

External links
 
Hideo Takamatsu at NHK

Japanese male film actors
20th-century Japanese male actors
1929 births
2007 deaths